Chemilly may refer to the following places in France:

 Chemilly, Allier, a commune in the department of Allier
 Chemilly, Haute-Saône, a commune in the department of Haute-Saône
 Chemilly-sur-Serein, a commune in the department of Yonne
 Chemilly-sur-Yonne, a commune in the department of Yonne